WinHex is a commercial disk editor and universal hexadecimal editor (hex editor) used for data recovery and digital forensics. It is made by X-Ways Software Technology AG of Germany. WinHex includes academic and forensic practitioners, the Oak Ridge National Laboratory, Hewlett-Packard, National Semiconductor, law enforcement agencies, and other companies with data recovery and protection needs.

WinHex is compatible with Windows XP through Windows 10.

Features 
WinHex offers the ability to:
 Read and directly edit hard drives (FAT and NTFS), floppy disks, CD-ROMs, DVDs, CompactFlash cards and other media
 Read and directly edit random-access memory (RAM)
 Interpret 20 data types
 Edit partition tables, boot sectors, and other data structures using templates
 Join and split files
 Analyze and compare files
 Search and replace
 Clone and image drives
 Recover data
 Encrypt files (AES-128)
 Create hashes and checksums
 Wipe drives

Forensics features with a Specialist license include the ability to:
 Gather free and slack space
 Search for text based on keywords
 Create tab-delimited tables of drive contents

See also 
 Comparison of hex editors

References

External links 
 

Computer data
Hex editors
Data recovery software